Veleropilina veleronis is a species of monoplacophoran, a superficially limpet-like marine mollusc. It is found off Cedros Island, Mexico in the Pacific Ocean.

References

Monoplacophora
Molluscs described in 1963